Legionella impletisoli is a Gram-negative bacterium from the genus Legionella which was isolated from soils which were contaminated with industrial wastes in Japan.

References

External links
Type strain of Legionella impletisoli at BacDive -  the Bacterial Diversity Metadatabase

Legionellales
Bacteria described in 2007